Cristina Scarlat (born 3 March 1981) is a Moldovan pop singer. She was born in Chișinău and represented Moldova in the Eurovision Song Contest 2014 in Copenhagen, Denmark, with the song "Wild Soul". She finished last in the semi-final, failing to qualify for the grand final.

Eurovision Song Contest

References

21st-century Moldovan women singers
Eurovision Song Contest entrants for Moldova
Eurovision Song Contest entrants of 2014
Living people
English-language singers from Moldova
Musicians from Chișinău
1981 births
Articles containing video clips